Aakramana is a 2014 Kannada horror film. This movie is an experimental movie made both in 2D and 3D format and it is the first 3D horror movie in Kannada.

Cast
 Raghu Mukherjee as Subhash
 Daisy Shah as Nireeksha
 Shilpi Sharma as Kaveri
 Makarand Deshpande
 Avinash
 K. P. Sridhar
 R. N. Sudarshan
 Kishori Ballal
 Danny Kuttapa
 Marco
 Ramesh Pandit
 Prakash Shenoy

Soundtrack

References

External links
 

Films set in Bangalore
2014 films
2014 horror films
Films about filmmaking
2010s Kannada-language films
2014 directorial debut films
Indian horror films